William H. Falkner III is an American politician. He is a member of the Missouri House of Representatives from the 10th District, serving since 2019. He is a member of the Republican party and former mayor of St. Joseph, Missouri.

Electoral History

State Representative

References

Living people
Republican Party members of the Missouri House of Representatives
Year of birth missing (living people)